Bryan Simpson (born October 15, 1984) is an American professional basketball player who last played for Tokio Marine Nichido Big Blue in Japan. He was selected by the Ryukyu Golden Kings with the 7th overall pick in the 2007 bj League draft.  He played for Okinawa for three seasons.

References

1984 births
Living people
American expatriate basketball people in Japan
American men's basketball players
Basketball players from Georgia (U.S. state)
People from Stone Mountain, Georgia
Ryukyu Golden Kings players
Sportspeople from DeKalb County, Georgia
Tokio Marine Nichido Big Blue players
Small forwards